Annika Beck and Laura Siegemund were the defending champions, but chose not to participate this year.

Lyudmyla and Nadiia Kichenok won the title, defeating Tímea Babos and Réka Luca Jani in the final, 6–3, 6–1.

Seeds
The top two seeds received a bye into the quarterfinals.

Draw

Bracket

References 
 Main Draw

Brasil Tennis Cup - Doubles
2016 Doubles